John Tracy Gaffey (November 1, 1860 – January 9, 1935) was a journalist, state and city official, real-estate speculator and investor at the turn of the 20th century in Los Angeles, California.

Personal 

Gaffey was born on November 1, 1860 in Galway, Ireland, the son of Thomas Gaffey and Ann E. Tracy. His father died when the boy was 5 years old. His oldest brother, William, became wanted by the authorities for sedition because of his beliefs regarding Irish independence, and so and his family, headed by a widow with seven children, emigrated to California in 1866-67 via the Isthmus of Panama. They pioneered near Santa Cruz on a cattle and sheep ranch, later moving to San Francisco, where Gaffey went to high school and then spent a year at the University of California, Berkeley.

He was married in St. Vibiana's Cathedral on June 1, 1887, to Arcadia Bandini, who was the granddaughter of pioneer Juan Bandini. Her mother was Esperanza de Sepulveda. They had two children, John and Margaret (Mrs. John Mell).

A Catholic, Gaffey was a founder of the California Club of Los Angeles and was a member of the Bohemian Club of San Francisco and the Tuna Club of Catalina Island. He was a member of the Los Angeles County Democratic Central Committee, the Federated Tax Reduction Leagues of the county and the Free Harbor League.

Around 1904 or 1905 he moved the family from Los Angeles to San Pedro, where he built a rustic ranch house in 1906, at 1131 West Third Street. He later moved that house across the street and on the first lot he built a three-story homet, which he named Hacienda La Rambla. It was razed in 1964 for the construction of a YMCA building.

Gaffey died January 9, 1935 in his home. He was survived by a son, W. Casey Gaffey of San Pedro, and a daughter, Mrs. Margaret Kilroy of Santa Monica. Burial was slated for Valley Church in Watsonville, California. He left an estate valued at $236,000.

Vocation 
At the age of 20, Gaffey became a reporter with the Santa Cruz Courier. In 1879, he founded a short-lived newspaper called the Santa Cruz Herald. Later, he became a law clerk for the California Supreme Court. In 1892 he was manager for Stephen M. White in his successful campaign for election to the U.S. Senate by the California State Legislature. In 1893, he became the first editor of the Los Angeles Herald.

He was a member of the Los Angeles City Council in 1892-94 and was collector of customs in 1890-93. He had mining interests in Mexico, oil interests in Texas and real-estate holdings. He was a member of the California State Board of Equalization. He played a major role in the founding of the Los Angeles Harbor in San Pedro.

Legacy 
In San Pedro, Gaffey Street was named after him, and a plaque memorializes him in the Gaffey Building, where he had his office, 333 West Sixth Streety.

References

External links 
 Gaffey's grave pictured at Find-a-Grave

Los Angeles City Council members
1860 births
1935 deaths
People from San Pedro, Los Angeles